Xintian may refer to the following places in China:

Xintian County, county in Hunan
Xintian, Anhui (新田), town in Xuancheng, Anhui
Xintian, Pengshui County (新田), town in Pengshui Miao and Tujia Autonomous County, Chongqing
Xintian, Wanzhou District (新田), town in Wanzhou District, Chongqing
Xintian, Lintao County (新添), town in Lintao County, Gansu
Xintian, Minle County (新天), town in Minle County, Gansu
Xintian, Longchuan County (新田), town in Longchuan County, Guangdong
Xintian, Luhe County (新田), town in Luhe County, Guangdong
Xintian, Guangxi (新田), town in Bobai County, Guangxi
Xintian Township, Hunan (新田乡), township in Xupu County, Hunan
Xintian, Xinfeng County (新田), town in Xinfeng County, Jiangxi
Xintian, Yichun (新田), town in Yichun, Jiangxi
Xintian Township, Shanxi (新田乡), township in Houma, Shanxi
Xintian Township, Sichuan (新田乡), township in Huidong County, Sichuan